Esaxerenone (brand name Minnebro; developmental code names CS-3150, XL-550) is a nonsteroidal antimineralocorticoid which was discovered by Exelixis and developed by Daiichi Sankyo Company and is approved in Japan for the treatment of hypertension. It acts as a highly selective silent antagonist of the mineralocorticoid receptor (MR), the receptor for aldosterone, with greater than 1,000-fold selectivity for this receptor over other steroid hormone receptors, and 4-fold and 76-fold higher affinity for the MR relative to the existing antimineralocorticoids spironolactone and eplerenone. As of January 2019, esaxerenone is in phase III clinical trials for diabetic nephropathies.

See also
 Apararenone
 Finerenone

References

External links
 Esaxerenone - AdisInsight

Primary alcohols
Antimineralocorticoids
Carboxamides
Pyrroles
Benzosulfones
Trifluoromethyl compounds
Ethanolamines